Hacıbahattin  is a  village in Aydıncık district of Mersin Province, Turkey. It is situated on the road connecting Aydıncık to Gülnar. The population of the Hacıbahattin was 167 as of 2012. The main economic sector is vegetable and fruit farming.

References

Villages in Aydıncık District (Mersin)